Fonte is a comune (municipality) in the Province of Treviso in the Italian region Veneto, located about  northwest of Venice and about  northwest of Treviso.

Fonte borders the following municipalities: Asolo, Crespano del Grappa, Pieve del Grappa, Riese Pio X, San Zenone degli Ezzelini.

Demographic evolution

References

Cities and towns in Veneto